Pachaimalai Arulmigu Subramanyaswamy Temple, also known as the Pachaimalai Balamurugan Temple, is one of the two major hill temples located in Gobichettipalayam, Tamil Nadu, India. The temple is dedicated to the Tamil god Murugan. The temple is constructed in the Tamil style of architecture and is located on top of a small hillock in the outskirts of the town of Gobichettipalayam near Pudupalayam.

Origin of name 
Pachaimalai means "green hill". It is believed that the presence of a water spring directly below the sanctum sanctorum gives the hill its name. During the drought years of 2001 to 2005, when the wells went dry in the areas around the hill, water was still available on top of the hill.

History
According to legend, Saint Durvasa visited the Shiva temple at Kunnathur during his temporary stay at Kongu Nadu.  

His mystic powers revealed to him that Modachur, a village near Gobichettipalayam, was the most suitable place for undertaking a penance on Lord Shiva. Upon reaching Modachur, he invokes Lord Shiva and went into a deep meditation. However, he longed for the dharshan of Lord Murugan. On Lord Shiva's advice, he reaches a small hillock: Pachaimalai. He worships Sri Murugan as Dhandayuthapani and installed a statue of him facing towards the west. 

As time went on, the temple at Pachaimalai was forgotten and left in a dilapidated state. However, in 1954, Amarar. P. K. Kuppusamy Gounder is said to have a seen a divine light emanating from the sanctum sanctorum of the shrine. He endeavored to start regular poojas and codified the practices and events at the temple. As a result of his efforts, the temple was completely rebuilt by 1980.

Architecture
The temple has a five story gopuram, a feature of Dravidian architecture. The main deity is Balamurugan, the child form of Lord Murugan. The main deity faces west. The temple also has a 40 feet (12.2 m) statue of Lord Senthilandavar, which is visible from the town of Gobichettipalayam. It is one of the largest statues of Murugan in the state. 

The temple also has shrines dedicated to various gods and goddesses including Vidya Ganapathy, Maragatheeswarar and His consort Maragathavalli, Kalyana Subramanyar with His consorts Valli and Deivanai, Maragatha Venkatesa Perumal with His consorts Sridevi and Bhoodevi, Dakshinamurthi, Bhairavar, and the Navagraham. At Pachaimalai, Navagrahangal can be seen with their consorts seated on their respective mounts, which is considered unusual.

Moolavar - Balamurugan 
The presiding deity of the temple is Sri Balamurugan in the form of Bala Dhandayuthapani. Swarnabandanam–the gold plate covering the pedastal–has been done for Moolavar.

Lord Shanmugar 
Pachaimalai is known for Lord Shanmugar, who is the manifestation of Lord Murugan with six faces. Every month during the days of Visakam, Shasti and Kiruthigai, Abihekam, and special Shanmugarchanai is performed for the Deity. During Skandha Shasti, Shanmugarchanai is done for six days consecutively. During the annual Bhramotsava which falls in the month of Panguni, one can witness Lord Shanmuga in three attires. In the first one, Lord Shanmuga and his consorts are adorned completely in white conveying that he is Brahma, the Creator. In the second, red attire conveys that he is Shiva, the Destroyer. On the day of Panguni Uthiram, he is clad in green, symbolizing that he is Vishnu, the Protector. Devotees offer green flowers, clothes, and rose water to the Deity on that day.

Lord Kalyana Subramanya 
At Pachaimalai, Sri Kalyana Subramanya presides over the chariot festival held on Panguni Uthiram every year. Kalyana Urchavam, the marriage ceremony, is performed for Lord Subramanya during Panguni Uthiram, Thai Poosam, and Kandar Shasti. He goes on fast for seven days during Kandar Shasti and Soorasamharam (சூரசம்ஹாரம்) is enacted by him in Gobichettipalayam. It is believed that the statue of the Subramanya is over 600 years old.

Kadamba tree 
The Kadamba Tree is honored as the Sthala Viruksham at Pachaimalai. The tree is considered very auspicious for Lord Murugan. The name "Kadamban" for Lord Murugan is derived from the name of this tree. The tree flowers only during the month of Chitirai.

Pujai
There are seven poojas scheduled daily at the temple. The pooja at 7 p.m. is considered auspicious. 

Every Tuesday, New Moon day (Amavasai), Sankatahara Chathurthi, Pradhosham, Full Moon day (Pournami), Theipirai Bhairavar Ashtami, Shashti and Kiruthigai are celebrated with special poojas. The temple has a golden peacock and a golden chariot in which the Deity is taken in a procession at 7 p.m. Arulmigu Dhandapani is taken to the golden chariot in his 'golden peacock' mount in complete golden attire.

Festivals

Panguni Uthiram 
The Brahmotsavam festival of the temple is celebrated in month of Panguni. Lord Kalyana Subramanyar is taken in a procession around the hill on the first six days in different mounts such as the Bootha Vahanam, Yaanai Vahanam (Elephant), Rishaba Vahanam (Ox), Annapatchi Vahanam (Swan), and Attukidai Vahanam (Goat). On the sixth day, Thiru Kalyana Utsavam is performed and the Sri Subramanyar graces the Wooden Chariot. On Panguni Uthiram day, the temple is visited by thousands of devotees who carry Kavadi and perform abishekam. The massive temple chariot is run on the same evening. Annadhanam is done to feed the thousands of devotees who visit the temple throughout the day.

Skandha Shasti Soorasamharam 
The Skanda Shasti Soorasamharam festival is enacted in the town of Gobichettipalayam. The Deity, mounted on an elephant, presides over the function to defeat and give salvation to Soorapadman, the personification of Ego. The festival is a symbolic celebration of the victory of the good over evil. The Deity and devotees undertake "Kandar Shasti Viratham", fasting for seven days. The fast is broken on the day after Kandar Shasti, after the Thirukalyana Utsavam.

Thai Poosam 
During the first half of the day, Kavadi abishekam is performed continuously. During the later part of the day, the presiding Deity of the temple graces in Thanga Kavasam–the golden Kavacha.

Vaikaasi Visaagam 'Lacharchanai' 
The annual Lacharchanai is conducted during Vaikasi Visakam for three days. On the final day, Shatru Samhara Homam and a grand abishekam is done for the Deity.

Special practices

Shatru Samhara Thirisadai Archanai 
Shatru Samhara Thirisadai Archanai glorifies and invokes Lord Subramanya using the six syllables of Sa-Ra-Va-Na-Bha-Va in different arrangements. It is done at Pachaimalai every Tuesday morning. Devotees are encouraged to recite the mantras along with the acharyas. The multitude of voices at the same time is said to give a sense of peace to the mind. 

Participation in this archanai is believed to lead to the destruction of evil and enemies. It is also considered to bestow the boon of marriage and children.

Shatru Samhara Homam 
Shatru Shamkara Homam is the yagna invoking Lord Subramanya. The purpose is to free oneself from the evils within oneself such as anger, ego, jealousy, and arrogance. It also cures the ill effects of pilli soonya (black magic). Shatru Shamkara Homam is done in a grand manner at Pachaimalai during Vaikasi Visagam (birth star of Muruga). It is done for six days consecutively during Skandha Shasti and Panguni Uthiram. It involves six sivacharyas who perform the Shatrusamhara thirisadai Archanai which is followed by the yagna.

Thaarabishekam 
Thaarabishekam is a vedic ceremony in which milk is dripped slowly on the Deity, through a Tharai or a Vessel. The ceremony is accompanied by the recitation of Rudram eleven times, invoking Shiva as Rudra and Parabrama.

Thaaraabishekam is done simultaneously for Sri Balamurugan (the presiding Deity) and Sri Maragatheeshwarar. It is done regularly during Agni Natchatiram, the hottest period of the year.

Thei Pirai Ashtami Bhairava Pooja 
On every Thei Pirai Ashtami, special poojas and homam are conducted for Kala Bhairava. The rituals begin in the evening with the Maha Kala Bhairava Homam. It is believed that participation in this homa will protect one from evil and black deeds. The homam or the yagna is followed by special  (ritual bathing) for Kala Bhairava. Punuku, a kind of natural scent, is offered to the deity. Hundreds of devotees can be found offering eleven Ellu Deepam, which is considered sacred to Lord Bhairava. At the end of the pooja, bitter gourd rice and Vada are given as Prasadam. This pooja attracts hundreds of devotees every month.

Annadhaanam 
Pachaimalai is also well-known for Annadhaanam–the act of feeding the devotees. Ceremonies at the temple are usually followed by Annadhanam. This temple is covered under the Annadhaanam Scheme of the Government of Tamil Nadu.

Gallery

References

External links
www.pachaimalai.in

Hindu temples in Erode district
Murugan temples in Tamil Nadu
Places in Gobichettipalayam